Raúl Iram Castillo González (born 30 May 2001) is a Mexican professional footballer who plays as a midfielder for Liga MX club Puebla.

Castillo made his professional debut with Pachuca on 8 April 2019, coming on as a substitute during a 0–0 Liga MX draw against Santos Laguna.

Career statistics

Club

References

External links
 at Official Liga MX Profile

Living people
2001 births
Mexican footballers
C.F. Pachuca players
Cancún F.C. footballers
Association football midfielders
Liga MX players
Liga de Expansión MX players
Footballers from Tamaulipas
People from Ciudad Victoria